Lance Hill is a retired U.S. soccer forward.   He spent one season in USISL.

Hill attended Creighton University, where he was part of the men's soccer team from 1990 to 1994.   During four seasons, he scored 21 goals and added 20 assists.  Hill was inducted into the Creighton Hall of Fame in 2007.

In 1995, Hill played for the New Orleans Riverboat Gamblers.  He was named a USISL South Central District Rookie of the Year and a first team All Star.  In February 1996, the Colorado Rapids selected Hill in the 11th round (102nd overall) of the 1996 MLS Inaugural Player Draft after an impressive showing in the MLS combine.  While he made the preseason roster, he was released before playing a regular season game.  In 2004, he played for Legends F.C. in the 2004 U.S. Open Cup.

References

1972 births
Living people
American soccer players
Creighton Bluejays men's soccer players
New Orleans Riverboat Gamblers players
USISL players
Association football forwards